Mikuriya Station is the name of three train stations in Japan:

 Mikuriya Station (Nagasaki) (御厨駅)
 Mikuriya Station (Shizuoka) (御厨駅)
 Mikuriya Station (Tottori) (御来屋駅)